Coláiste Éanna Christian Brothers School is a Roman Catholic secondary school for boys in Ballyroan, Dublin, Ireland. It was founded in 1967 by the Congregation of Christian Brothers to serve the needs of the Ballyroan and adjacent parishes.

It is home to 601 pupils and a staff of 43 teachers and eight ancillary staff. The school is administered by a Board of Management appointed by the Edmund Rice Schools Trust. The Irish Christian Brothers handed over ownership of Coláiste Éanna to the Trust in 2008.

The school operates six formal years of teaching from first to sixth year including an optional Transition Year in fourth Year. Every year is divided up into three or four classes with a maximum of 27 students per class in Junior Cycle and 20 in Senior Cycle. Subjects taught in the school include Accounting, Art, Biology, Business Studies, Chemistry, Computer Studies, CSPE, Design and Communication Graphics, Economics, English, Irish, French,  Spanish, Geography, Graphics, History, Material Technology, Mathematics, Music, Physical Education, Physics, Religion, Science, SPHE, and Technical Graphics. Extra curricular activities include Hurling, Gaelic football, Soccer, Basketball, Golf, Table Tennis, athletics, theatre and drama, music and choir, debating, European Youth Parliament, chess, bridge, martial arts.

All subjects are taught in English.

Notable alumni

 Philip Cairns, 13-year-old boy who mysteriously vanished in 1986
 Pádraig Harrington, professional golfer
 Stephen Hiney, Dublin hurler
 Sean Hughes, comedian, writer and actor
 Brendan Leahy, bishop of Limerick
 George Lee, correspondent for Raidió Teilifís Éireann
 Paul McGinley, professional golfer
 Niall Mellon, entrepreneur
 Dave Mooney, professional footballer
 Colin Moran, Dublin footballer
 Paul Ryan, Dublin hurler
 Graham Shaw, field hockey player and coach

References

Rathfarnham
Secondary schools in South Dublin (county)
Congregation of Christian Brothers secondary schools in the Republic of Ireland
Boys' schools in the Republic of Ireland